Zwiesel is a town in the lower-Bavarian district of Regen, and since 1972 is a Luftkurort with particularly good air. The name of the town was derived from the Bavarian word stem "zwisl" which refers to the form of a fork. The fork of the rivers Großer Regen and Kleiner Regen and the land that lies between these two rivers were called Zwiesel.

Geography
The town of Zwiesel is situated in an extensive valley basin at the foot of the mountain range formed by the peaks of the Großer Arber (1,456 m), Großer Falkenstein (1,315 m) and Kiesruck (1,265 m), exactly at the spot where the two rivers, the Großer Regen and the Kleiner Regen join and form the Black Regen. In addition to be accessed by the federal road B11, the town of Zwiesel has a main railway station run by the Bavarian Forest Railway, where trains depart for Plattling, Bayerisch Eisenstein or Bodenmais at hourly intervals, and for Grafenau at two-hour intervals.

Division of the town
Zwiesel consists of 11 districts:
 Ableg
 Bärnzell
 Glasberg
 Griesbach
 Innenried
 Klautzenbach 
 Lichtenthal
 Rabenstein
 Theresienthal
 Zwiesel
 Zwieselberg

Mineralogy
In the area of Zwiesel a great diversity of mineralogical compositions can be found and especially the glass manufacturing companies benefited from the outstanding amount of quartz. The most famous mining site is probably the quartz quarry at the mountain "Hennenkobel" (the name translates as chicken coop) where many rare and popular minerals were found. The mineral Zwieselite, which can be found there, was named after the glass town of Zwiesel.

History
According to the legend, the first settlers were gold diggers. It was in 1255 that Zwiesel was first mentioned as a village with a wooden chapel. In 1280 the area was an important trading centre for goods to and from Bohemia. From the year 1313 on, Zwiesel was already designated to as a market municipality. On 11 September 1560, the municipality of Zwiesel was granted the coat of arms by the Duke of Bavaria, Albrecht V., which is valid still today. Philipp Apian indicated the place on his map of 1568 calling it "Zwisel".

The development of Zwiesel was frequently hampered by wars and epidemic plagues. I.e. the area was destroyed in 1431 by the Hussites, in 1468 during the "Böckler" war and in 1633 by the Swedish army during the Thirty Years' War.

It was as early as in the 16th century that mining started in Zwiesel at the Rotkot mine.
In 1767 another church was built, known as "Bergkirche", and in 1838 the present town hall was constructed. Serious fires were raging in the municipality in the years 1825, 1832, 1846, 1849 and 1870. With the latter fire, on 19 August 1876, the parish church burst into flames too. Water pipes were laid in 1888, electricity was available from 1896. In the years between 1891 and 1896 the main parish church Staint Nicholas was built. In 1904 Zwiesel was raised to the status of a town and quickly became the economic and cultural centre of the middle part of the Bavarian Forest.

From the very beginning development was driven by glass and timber. The regional glass industry around Zwiesel dates back to the 15th century (the glass hut of Rabenstein was founded in 1421). In 1836 the glass factory of Theresienthal was founded and in 1872 the master glass maker, Anton Müller, started to build the glass works Annathal, which later became the Schott-Werke. Today this factory operates under the name of Zwiesel Kristallglas plc. and is an important producer of goblets in Germany. In 1904 the technical school for glass manufacturing and decorating professions was founded, which continuously developed into a national training centre for glass related professions.

At the end of World War II, at noon on 20 April 1945, the bombing of the railway bridges destroyed several houses, 15 civilians died. On 22 April 1945 Zwiesel was handed over to the American army without any further bloodshed.
An outstanding event in recent town history was the Bavarian State Exhibition Bavaria - Bohemia: 1500 years of neighbourhood. Many visitors of the exhibition also came from the neighbouring Czech Republic.

Etymology
The name of the town was mentioned in 1254 as "Zwisel", soon after in 1301 as "Zwiseln", in 1738 as "Zwisl" and in 1832 as "Zwiesel" or "Zwisel". The Middle High German word "zwisel" means "fork" and refers to the merging of the rivers Großer Regen and Kleiner Regen as well as to a junction of streets.

Incorporations
In the course of regional reforms the community of Klautzenbach was incorporated on 1 October 1971. On 1 January 1978 the larger part of the community of Rabenstein was added, too. The community of Bärnzell spanning over 1250 hectares with 652 inhabitants living there, was  incorporated on 1 May 1978.

Religions
 The Protestant church "Kreuzkirche"
 Roman Catholic church
As early as in the year 1356, the place had an own pastoral worker who was subordinated as vicar to the priest of the town of Regen. In 1558 the branch was raised to the status of a parish. From 1962 there is also the Augustinian monastery Maria Trost (OSA) which was founded by monks of the Sudetenland and which belongs to the Vicariate of Vienna.
 Protestant church
As a consequence of the Bavarian Edict of Religion of the year 1803 issued by Elector Maximilian, Protestant Christians started settling in Zwiesel. In 1885 the Evangelic Association Zwiesel was founded and achieved that in 1889 a location for a traveling priest was established in Zwiesel. On 29 May 1895 the neo-Gothic church in the Bahnhofstraße (today renamed in Dr.-Schott-Straße) was inaugurated. In 1922 the Protestant church in Zwiesel was raised to the status of parish. 
 New Apostolic Church
A New Apostolic Community with its own church house was also established in Zwiesel.

Demographic development
In the year of 1800 Zwiesel had 803 inhabitants living in 140 houses. As early as in 1810 the one thousandth inhabitant could be counted. In 1867 the market municipality of Zwiesel had 2,303 inhabitants living in 243 houses. By 1900 the number of inhabitants had increased to 3,760 with 333 houses. After World War II the number increased to 5885 inhabitants. The highest level was reached in the year 1984 with 10,670 people registered. Currently 9,257 people live in the town of Zwiesel and its surrounding neighbourhoods.

Politics

Town council
Since the latest local election on 16 March 2014 the Town Council of Zwiesel is formed as follows:
 CSU: 7 seats
 SPD: 5 seats
 Freie Wähler (Free voters community) FW: 5 seats
 Parteifreie Wählergemeinschaft (Independent voters' association) PWG: 4 seats
 The Greens: 3 seats

Mayor
Since the 13 February 2011 Franz Xaver Steininger has been the First Mayor (independent). He was elected the new mayor in the second ballot with 60.57% of the votes. He was reelected in December 2016 with 55.4% of the votes.

Twin towns
Since May 2006 Zwiesel has maintained an official town twinning with the port town of Brake (Lower Saxony) at the river Weser. Brake is approximately 800 km from Zwiesel.

Economy
Glass making, brewing, and tourism are the most important industries in the town.

Notable people
 Dragan Holcer (1945–2015), Yugoslavian footballer
 Franz Bernreiter (born 1954), biathlete, Olympic medalist
 Klaus Gattermann (born 1961), ski racer
 Susanne Kiermayer (born 1968), sport shooter, Olympic medalist
 Lutz Pfannenstiel (born 1973), footballer
 Tessa Ganserer (born 1977), politician
 Josef Wenzl (born 1984), cross-country skier
 Lukas Mühl (born 1997), footballer

Associated with the town
 Walter Demel (born 1935), cross-country skier
 Klaus Fischer (born 1949), national footballer
 Heinz Wittmann (born 1943), footballer (started his career at SC Zwiesel)

Gallery

References

External links

Zwiesel tourist office 
Schott glassmakers

Regen (district)
Bavarian Forest